Æther Shanties is the 10th album by steampunk band Abney Park. It is subtitled Further Trials and Tribulations of Abney Park. 
It is also their second steampunk themed album.

Recording
According to an interview with Robert the album was 95% done recording when a heatwave hit Seattle, destroying their hard-drive. This event allowed them to add the vocals of their new singer, Jody Ellen, onto the album, but delayed the release of the album for several months.

Track listing

Personnel 

 Robert Brown – songs, vocals, darbuka, diatonic button accordion, harmonica, bouzouki
 Kristina Erickson – keyboards, piano
 Nathaniel Johnstone – guitar, violin, mandolin
 Daniel Cederman – bass, acoustic guitar
 Jody Ellen – secondary vocals

References 

Abney Park (band) albums
2009 albums